Fernando Omar Barrientos (born 17 November 1991) is an Argentine footballer who plays for All Boys as a midfielder.

Honours
Lanús
Copa Sudamericana: 2013
 Atletico Paranaense 
Copa Paranaense: 2016

References

External links

1991 births
Living people
Sportspeople from Lanús
Argentine footballers
Argentine expatriate footballers
Association football midfielders
Argentine Primera División players
Campeonato Brasileiro Série A players
Segunda División players
Paraguayan Primera División players
Primera B de Chile players
Club Atlético Lanús footballers
Rosario Central footballers
Villarreal CF B players
Club Athletico Paranaense players
Defensa y Justicia footballers
Club Guaraní players
Cobreloa footballers
All Boys footballers
Argentine expatriate sportspeople in Spain
Argentine expatriate sportspeople in Brazil
Argentine expatriate sportspeople in Paraguay
Argentine expatriate sportspeople in Chile
Expatriate footballers in Spain
Expatriate footballers in Brazil
Expatriate footballers in Paraguay
Expatriate footballers in Chile